Grandes ilusiones is a Mexican telenovela produced by Televisa for Telesistema Mexicano in 1963.

Cast 
Héctor Gómez
Aurora Molina
Eric del Castillo
Andrea Cotto
Miguel Macía
Jacqueline Andere
Anita Blanch
Celia Manzano
Nicolás Rodríguez
Guillermo Herrera

References

External links 

Mexican telenovelas
1963 telenovelas
Televisa telenovelas
1963 Mexican television series debuts
1963 Mexican television series endings
Spanish-language telenovelas